John Blyth Barrymore III (born May 15, 1954) is an American film and television actor.

He is known for his role as Zeke in the 1970s television series Kung Fu, which was his first role on television.

Biography
John Blyth Barrymore III was born to John Drew Barrymore and Cara Williams. As such, he is from the famous Barrymore family: He is the half-brother of American actress Drew Barrymore, as well as the grandnephew of Ethel Barrymore and Lionel Barrymore. He is of partial Irish descent through his great-grandfather, actor Maurice Costello. John has stated that he does not remember if he met his aunt Diana Barrymore, who was also an actress.

Norman Abbott, the director of the television show The Munsters, requested that John play the role of Eddie Munster in the show. John's mother did not allow him to take the role, and in later years John thanked his mother for not allowing him to become a child actor.

Like his father, John has had a sporadic career in film and television, mainly appearing in shlock horror movies and comedies. John found himself homeless in 2012. While on skid row, he took to wearing a shirt printed with "I'm Drew Barrymore's brother".

After John's sister Jessica Barrymore was found dead in her vehicle in 2014, he publicly criticized half-sister Drew for not being receptive to forming a relationship with either him or Jessica.

In 2017, he appeared in an hour-long episode of Lasagna Cat, a web-series parodying Jim Davis's comic-strip series Garfield, by the production team Fatal Farm. His performance consisted of a tribute and in-depth philosophical analysis of a Garfield comic strip from July 27, 1978 which features Garfield smoking Jon's pipe to his dismay, as he describes it as a single perfect Garfield comic strip.

Filmography

Further reading
Pilato, Herbie J., The Kung Fu Book of Caine: The Complete Guide to TV's First Mystical Eastern Western. Boston: Charles A. Tuttle (1993);

References

External links

1954 births
20th-century American male actors
21st-century American male actors
20th-century American Jews
21st-century American Jews
American male film actors
American male television actors
American people of English descent
American people of German descent
American people of Irish descent
American people of Romanian-Jewish descent
American people of Austrian-Jewish descent
John Blyth Barrymore
Jewish American male actors
Living people
People from Greater Los Angeles